"Walk of Life" is a song by the British rock band Dire Straits, the third track on their fifth studio album Brothers in Arms (1985). It subsequently appeared on their live album On the Night (1993). It was released as a single October 1985 but had first been available as the B-side of "So Far Away" released in advance of Brothers in Arms.

The track peaked at number seven in the US charts, becoming their third and last top ten hit. It was their biggest commercial hit in the UK (along with "Private Investigations"), peaking at number two. The track also appeared on three compilation albums: 1988's Money for Nothing, 1998's Sultans of Swing: The Very Best of Dire Straits, and 2005's The Best of Dire Straits & Mark Knopfler: Private Investigations.

History
Mark Knopfler had not originally intended "Walk of Life" for the album, but rather as a B-side to one of the singles.  Dire Straits manager Ed Bicknell heard it when it was being mixed and convinced Knopfler to include it on the album at the last minute.

A simple rock and roll rhythm is used, with chord changes limited to I, IV and V chords. The long introduction has become iconic in some circles, with an instantly recognisable riff played on a synthesizer-driven keyboard with hints of the blues. The singer mentioned in the lyrics, "Johnny", is said to perform "down in the tunnels, trying to make it pay", a reference to busking in the subway. The songs he plays are oldies, including "I Got a Woman", "Be-Bop-A-Lula", "What'd I Say", "My Sweet Lovin' Woman", and "Mack the Knife". He also plays talking blues.

Two music videos were produced for "Walk of Life", the first video features the band playing the song in concert while the character Johnny is playing 1950s songs in a tunnel, the second video features the band playing with clips of sports bloopers.

Reception
Cash Box said that song recalls "the band's '50s rock infatuation first heard on 'Twisting by the Pool'", but that it "is a more profound but equally energetic effort". Cash Box later said that "a light sound is balanced by a meaningful lyric and wrapped in trademark Knopfler guitar accents". Billboard said that "Knopfler and friends bob out to a cajun/zydeco track that might have sounded weird if Rockin' Sidney hadn't broken the ice."

Track listings
7" single
"Walk of Life" – 4:07	
"One World" – 3:36

12" single
"Walk of Life" – 4:07	
"Why Worry" (Instrumental) – 3:56	
"One World" – 3:36

Chart performance

Weekly charts

Year-end charts

Certifications

See also
List of number-one singles of 1986 (Ireland)

References

1985 singles
1985 songs
Dire Straits songs
Irish Singles Chart number-one singles
Song recordings produced by Mark Knopfler
Songs written by Mark Knopfler
Vertigo Records singles
Warner Records singles
Music videos directed by Stephen R. Johnson